The Minister for Health and Social Services is a cabinet position in the Welsh Government, currently held by Eluned Morgan MS.

The minister is responsible for the running of the National Health Service in Wales, all aspects of public health and health protection in Wales, the Food Standards Agency in Wales, post-graduate medical education and any charges for NHS services.

The position was briefly titled as Cabinet Secretary for Health, Well-being and Sport from 2016 to 2018. Under the Government of the 5th Assembly (2018) the position was renamed to its previous name.

Ministers

See also 
 Healthcare in Wales
 NHS Wales
 Food Standards Agency
 Public Health Wales

References

External links 
 Health and Social Care at the Welsh Government website
 The NHS Wales website
 Public Health Wales

Welsh Government
Health ministers of the United Kingdom
Health in Wales
Wales